Tatul is a village in the Talin Municipality of the Aragatsotn Province of Armenia. The village was inhabited by Armenians until 1918. The village was renamed after the First Nagorno-Karabakh War commander and the National Hero of Armenia Tatul Krpeyan, who was born in the village.

References

External links 

Populated places in Aragatsotn Province
Yazidi populated places in Armenia